José Sótero Valero Ruz (April 22, 1936 – June 29, 2012) was a Roman Catholic bishop of the Roman Catholic Diocese of Guanare, Venezuela.

Ordained to the priesthood in 1966, Valero Ruz was named bishop in 1998 and resigned in 2011.

Notes

Venezuelan Roman Catholic bishops
Venezuelan Roman Catholics
1936 births
2012 deaths
Roman Catholic bishops of Guanare
Roman Catholic bishops of Valencia en Venezuela